The 1982 Winston 500 was a NASCAR Winston Cup Series race that took place May 2, 1982, at Alabama International Motor Speedway in Talladega, Alabama.

The makes of the cars in the race were 1 Oldsmobile, 9 Pontiacs, 5 Fords, 1 Chevrolet, 1 Dodge, and 24 Buicks.

Background
Talladega Superspeedway, originally known as Alabama International Motor Superspeedway (AIMS), is a motorsports complex located north of Talladega, Alabama. It is located on the former Anniston Air Force Base in the small city of Lincoln. The track is a Tri-oval and was constructed by International Speedway Corporation, a business controlled by the France Family, in the 1960s. Talladega is most known for its steep banking and the unique location of the start/finish line - located just past the exit to pit road. The track currently hosts the NASCAR series such as the Sprint Cup Series, Xfinity Series, and the Camping World Truck Series.

Qualifying
It broke the previous qualifying record of  set in 1970 by Bobby Isaac.

Race report 
There were 40 drivers on the grid; all of them were American-born. Darrell Waltrip defeated Terry Labonte by approximately three car lengths even though Labonte had a fender under Waltrip coming to the finish line. Waltrip earned $44,250 for winning the race ($ when adjusted for inflation). In the final laps before the checkered flag, the race became a battle between Benny Parsons, Darrell Waltrip, Terry Labonte and Kyle Petty. Parsons would lead seven of those laps while Waltrip led 13 followed by Labonte leading two. The green flag was waved at 1:00 P.M. while the checkered flag was waved at approximately 4:19 P.M.; There were eight cautions for 39 laps. The race covered 188 laps of the  track, totaling . Attendance was announced at 100,000 spectators.

David Simko crashed his vehicle on lap 4 while L. W. Wright blew his engine on lap 13. Further engine failures would be caused by Jody Ridley on lap 16, Cale Yarborough on lap 17 and Ron Bouchard on lap 23. Steve Moore's vehicle developed problems with its clutch that forced Moore out of the race on lap 32. Lake Speed blew his engine on lap 39 while Geoffrey Bodine did the same thing on lap 53. A valve sidelined Rick Wilson on lap 57. Lennie Pond would cause terminal damage to his vehicle on lap 66 while Dave Marcis blew his engine on the same lap. Elliott Forbes-Robinson would be relegated to the sidelines due to a nonworking engine on lap 73 while a problematic piston took Bill Scott out of the race on lap 75.

Richard Petty had an issue with his vehicle's fuel pump that would knock him out of the race on lap 82 while transmission problems took out Bill Elliott on lap 100. Buddy Baker developed steering problems with his vehicle on lap 109; forcing his early exit from the race. An engine issue took out Joe Ruttman on lap 159 and John Anderson on lap 164.

Terry Labonte took the championship lead after this race. Ferrel Harris would retire after this race with a 23rd-place finish. One-time NASCAR driver L. W. Wright would race his only professional stock car event on this day. The sole Chevrolet driver on the grid, L. W. Wright was a con artist who managed to swindle people into financing him getting a ride for this race, as well as an attempt at another at the next race where he failed to make the grid. His credentials as a licensed NASCAR driver were not requested during the early 1980s.

Results

Notes 

 Sources conflict as to whether Dick May or D. K. Ulrich raced in the 1982 Winston 500.
 L. W. Wright did not receive any driver points, as a late entrant to the race.

Standings after the race

References

May 1982 sports events in the United States
NASCAR races at Talladega Superspeedway
Winston 500
Winston 500